The International Surfing Association (ISA) is the world governing authority for surfing, SUP racing, SUP surfing, para surfing, bodyboarding and all other wave riding activities. The ISA is recognized by the International Olympic Committee.

After the 2022 Russian invasion of Ukraine, the ISA banned athletes and officials from Russia from ISA events, and said the ISA would not stage events in Russia.

History 
The ISA was originally named the International Surfing Federation (ISF) between 1964 and 1973. An Open Division World Championships has been contested biennially since 1964, a Junior World Championships since 1980, a Masters World Championships since 2007 and a Stand Up Paddle World Championship since 2011.

Recognition as governing body of surfing 
In 1982 the SportAccord, formerly known as General Association of International Sports Federations (GAISF), recognized the ISA as the world's governing body of surfing. in 1995 the International Olympic Committee granted the ISA provisional recognition. ISA was admitted into the Olympic movement at 1997 when the recognition was confirmed by the IOC.

International Surfing Association (ISA) is a Member of:

 Association of IOC Recognised International Sports Federations (ARISF)
 SportAccord formerly known as General Association of International Sports Federations (GAISF) 
 International World Games Association (IWGA)
 World Anti-Doping Agency

Mission 
The ISA's mission is to make a better world through surfing, which it does through crowning World Champions, surf and SUP instructor certification, worldwide membership, grassroots development, and annual scholarships awarded to surfers in need.

Olympic Surfing

Olympic Bid 
The organizing committee for the 2020 Games in Tokyo announced on 22 June 2015 that surfing was among the sports shortlisted for inclusion at the 2020 Summer Olympics. On 3 August 2016, during the 129th IOC Session at the Rio de Janeiro 2016 Olympic Games, the IOC unanimously voted to include five new sports, among them surfing, to the sports program of the Tokyo 2020 Games.

Surfing was included in the Tokyo 2020 Games on a one-off basis, and the ISA now has shifted their focused towards securing surfing's inclusion in the next editions of the Olympics, including Paris 2024 and LA 2028.

Olympic Qualification Process 
On 16 March 2018, the International Surfing Association (ISA) welcomed the release by the International Olympic Committee (IOC) of the approved qualification system for Surfing's Olympic debut at Tokyo 2020, ensuring the participation of the world's best professional surfers as well as promoting universal opportunities for surfers from around the world at the Games.

The key elements of the qualification system are as follows:

 20 men, 20 women.
 Maximum of 2 surfers per gender per National Olympic Committee (NOC).
 Qualification spots will be earned on an individual basis, by name.
 In accordance with IOC guidelines, the qualification events have been determined in hierarchical order of qualification, as further explained below; If two surfers of a gender have qualified through the first hierarchical order, that NOC will not be able to qualify more surfers of that gender through qualifying events lower in hierarchical order.
 All surfers selected by their respective National Federations for their national teams must participate in 2019 and 2021 ISA World Surfing Games in order to be eligible for Olympic qualification. The final details of the eligibility requirements are still under review by the ISA and the IOC.

The hierarchical order of qualification are as follows:

 2019 World Surf League Championship Tour: First 10 eligible men and first 8 eligible women.
 2021 ISA World Surfing Games: First 4 eligible men and first 6 eligible women.
 2019 ISA World Surfing Games: 4 men and 4 women selected based on their continent. Top finishing eligible surfer of each gender from Africa, Asia, Europe and Oceania.
 2019 Pan American Games: First eligible man and first eligible woman in the surfing competitions.
 Host nation slot: One man and one woman slot will be guaranteed for the host nation of Japan, unless already filled through the above hierarchies. Should athletes from Japan qualify regularly, their slots will be reallocated to the highest ranked eligible surfers from the 2021 World Surfing Games.

To see the full Qualification Process for Surfing in the Tokyo 2020 Olympics, click here.

ISA World Events 
The ISA runs world events across all disciplines of surfing. ISA world events include:

 ISA World Surfing Games
 ISA World Junior Surfing Championship
 ISA World SUP and Paddleboard Championship
 ISA World Adaptive Surfing Championship
 ISA World Longboard Surfing Championship
 ISA World Bodyboard Championship
 ISA World Masters Surfing Championship
 ISA World Kneeboard Championship

ISA World Surfing Games 

The ISA World Surfing Games is an Olympic style team competition that gathers National Delegations from around the world. Each team can field up to three men and three women. The surfers compete for individual medals and the coveted Fernando Aguerre World Team Trophy, named for and donated by the ISA President.

The event was first held in 1964 in Manly, Australia under the name 'ISA World Surfing Championships.'

Stemming from the global growth of Surfing spurred by inclusion in the Olympic Games, the 2017 edition of the ISA World Surfing Games broke the record for country participation. The previous record was set in 1996 when 36 nations graced the shores of Huntington Beach, USA, but in Biarritz 47 countries competed, shattering the record.

Many nations had representation in the event for the first time in history in 2017, including Afghanistan, China, Chinese Taipei, Greece, Senegal and South Korea.

ISA World Junior Surfing Championship 
The ISA hosted its first World Junior Surfing Championship in 1980 in Biarritz, France, where legendary surfer Tom Curren became the first ISA World Junior Champion, helping to launch his successful career. The event was held as a division of the ISA World Surfing Games until 2003, when it was held as a stand-alone event for the first time in Durban, South Africa.

Historically, the ISA World Junior Surfing Championship has served as a glimpse into the future stars of the sport. Past ISA World Junior Champions include the 2014 WSL Champion Gabriel Medina (BRA, 2010), Tatiana Weston-Webb (HAW, 2014, 2013), Filipe Toledo (BRA, 2011), Tyler Wright (AUS, 2010, 2009), Alejo Muniz (BRA, 2008), Laura Enever (AUS, 2008), Sally Fitzgibbons (AUS, 2007), Julian Wilson (AUS, 2006), Owen Wright (AUS, 2006), Stephanie Gilmore (AUS, 2005, 2004), Matt Wilkinson (AUS, 2004), Jordy Smith (RSA, 2003) and Leonardo Fioravanti (ITA, 2015).

ISA World Adaptive Surfing Championship 
The ISA World Adaptive Surfing Championship was created to give surfers with physical challenges an opportunity to compete and display their talents in a Paralympic-style, world-class competition.

The event has experienced unprecedented growth since the inaugural edition in 2015. The World Championship has spurred growth of the sport around the world, with nations such as France, Australia, Chile, Brazil, USA, Hawaii and South Africa holding National Championships of their own to select their National Teams to bring to California.

The 2017 edition shattered participation records with 109 athletes from 26 countries, more than a 50% increase from the inaugural edition of the event in 2015.

ISA World SUP and Paddleboard Championship 
The ISA World SUP and Paddleboard Championship is an Olympic-style, team competition that combines the disciplines of SUP Surfing, SUP Racing and Paddleboard Racing. The athletes compete for individual gold medals and the Club Waikiki-Peru ISA World Team Champion Trophy awarded to the team that wins the gold medal.

The 2017 edition of the event was the first to feature gender equality across all divisions, reflective of the rapid growth of women's SUP racing and surfing.

Authority and Development of StandUp Paddle (SUP) 
The ISA has been the organizer of the sole World Championship for SUP and Paddleboard since 2012. The event was first held in Peru (2012, 2013), with following editions held in Nicaragua (2014), Mexico (2015), Fiji (2016), and Denmark (2017).

Through development programs, scholarships for young SUP athletes, and promoting Championships at the national level, SUP has experienced explosive growth under the ISA's guidance, which can be observed in the participation levels seen in the World Championship that have nearly quadrupled since its inception.

The ISA presented both Surfing and SUP to the Tokyo 2020 Organizing Committee for inclusion in the Olympic Sports Program. Tokyo 2020 only elected Surfing to be included in the Games and not SUP, however achievements such as inclusion in the 2019 Pan American Games and 2017 Central American Games have added momentum to the ISA's push for inclusion in the 2024 Olympics.

Executive committee 
The ISA Executive Committee is composed of the ISA President, ISA Executive Director and four Vice Presidents. Its mission is to define ISA strategies and plans of action, “For a Better Surfing Future.” The executive committee works with the ISA staff throughout the year to develop future plans.

Current Executive Committee (as of April 2018):

 President - Fernando Aguerre (ARG)
 Executive Director - Robert Fasulo (USA)
 Vice President - Karin Sierralta (PER)
 Vice President - Kirsty Coventry (ZIM)
 Vice President - Casper Steinfath (DEN)
 Vice President - Barbara Kendall (NZL)

ISA Athletes' Commission 
On 24 April 2018 the ISA announced the formation of a new Athletes’ Commission to ensure that athletes’ opinions are heard at the highest level of governance in Surfing, StandUp Paddle (SUP), and all surf-related disciplines.

France's Justine Dupont, who has medaled across three ISA disciplines (Shortboard, Longboard, and SUP), has been appointed the Chair of the commission. Dupont earned Team Gold at the 2017 ISA World Surfing Games and individual Silver in SUP Surfing at the 2017 ISA World SUP and Paddleboard Championship.

Barbara Kendall (NZL), ISA Vice President, Chair of the Association of National Olympic Committees (ANOC) Athletes’ Commission, and five-time Olympian serves as the Ex Officio of the commission.

The full ISA Athletes’ Commission consists of the following members:

Chair:  Justine Dupont (FRA)

Ex Officio: Barbara Kendall (NZL)

Members:
Dylan Lightfoot (RSA)
Alana Nichols (USA)
Masatoshi Ohno (JPN)
Casper Steinfath (DEN)
Miguel Tudela (PER)
Ella Williams (NZL)

Membership 
The ISA has 103 member nations.

Members
The following table contains the ISA members:

ISA Recognized International Surfing Organizations
 World Surf League (WSL), formerly known as Association of Surfing Professionals (ASP)
 Christian Surfers International (CSI)
  ALAS LATIN TOUR
  European Surfing Federation
  Pan-American Surf Association (PASA)
  Stand Up Paddle Athletes Association

Honorary life members
 Alan Atkins, Australia
 Eduardo Arena, Peru
 Jacques Hele, France
 Reginald Prytherch, United Kingdom
 Rod Brooks, Australia
 Tim Millward, South Africa

Awards and honors 
Somewhat in line with the tradition of the Olympic Games a gold, silver, bronze and copper medals are awarded to the 1st, 2nd, 3rd and 4th placed athletes who compete for the honor to represent their country and national colors, in the true nature of surfing's aloha spirit and fair play.

ISA 50th Anniversary World Surfing Games

Overall team results 

  11,402 points, (Champion Gold Medal)
  - 11,340 points, (Silver Medal)
  - 10,922 points, (Bronze Medal)
  - 9,508 points, (Copper Medal)
  - 8,330 points
  - 8,268 points
  - 7,830 points
  - 6,720 points
  - 6,540 points
  - 6,400 points
  - 6,352 points
  - 6,340 points
  - 5,760 points
  - 5,540 points
  - 4,560 points
  - 3,952 points
  - 3,756 points
  - 3,456 points
  - 2,520 points
  - 2,280 points
  - 1,152 points
  - 720 points

Open Men 
. Leandro Usuna (ARG), Gold Medal
. Anthony Fillingim (CRI), Silver Medal
. Shane Holmes (AUS), Bronze Medal
. Nicholas Squires (AUS), Copper Medal

Open Women 
. Anali Gomez (PER), Gold Medal
. Dominic Barona (ECU), Silver Medal
. Philippa Anderson (AUS), Bronze Medal
. Jessica Grimwood (AUS), Copper Medal

References

External links
 International Surfing Association official website
 International Surfing Association World Gold Medalists

Surfing
Surfing organizations
Sports organizations established in 1964